BQ, Bq, or bq may refer to:

Places
 Navassa Island (FIPS PUB 10-4 territory code BQ)
 Caribbean Netherlands (ISO 3166-1 alpha-2 country code)
 .bq, the country-code Top Level Domain for Caribbean Netherlands
 British Antarctic Territory (former ISO 3166-1 alpha-2 country code)

Businesses and organizations
 Aeromar Líneas Aéreas Dominicanas (IATA airline designator BQ)
 Bin Quraya, leading heavy equipment rental firm in Saudi Arabia 
 Birds Queensland, the ornithological society of Queensland, Australia
 Bloc Québécois, a political party of Canada
 BQ (company), a Spanish user electronics company
 BQ Aquaris, the company's brand of devices

Science and technology
 Becquerel (Bq), the SI derived unit of radioactivity
 Benzoquinone, a chemical compound
 BQ.1 and BQ.1.1 (Cerberus), SARS-CoV-2 Omicron variants
 BQ-788, a selective ETB antagonist
 BQ-123, a cyclic peptide 
 Broadcast quality, a video quality standard for broadcast television

Other uses
 Boston Qualifier, a qualifier in the Boston Marathon
 Band Queer, etymologically Band Qualified, a member of the Fightin' Texas Aggie Band

See also

BBQ, shorthand for barbecue
 
 BQS (disambiguation)